Zheng Jie was the defending champion, but she lost in the first round to Jamie Hampton.

Agnieszka Radwańska won the title, defeating Yanina Wickmayer in the final, 6–4, 6–4.

Seeds

Draw

Finals

Top half

Bottom half

Qualifying

Seeds

Qualifiers

Lucky loser 
  Gréta Arn

Draw

First qualifier

Second qualifier

Third qualifier

Fourth qualifier

References 
 Main draw
 Qualifying draw

ASB Classic
2013 Singles